Brian Tanner may refer to:

 Brian Tanner, a character in the TV series ALF
 Brian Keith Tanner (born 1947), British physicist